The Barry M. Goldwater Scholarship and Excellence in Education Program was established by the United States Congress in 1986 in honor of former United States Senator and 1964 presidential candidate Barry Goldwater. Its goal is to provide a continuing source of highly qualified scientists, mathematicians, and engineers by awarding scholarships to college students who are US citizens or permanent residents and intend to pursue careers in these fields.

The scholarship—the most prestigious national undergraduate scholarship in the natural sciences, engineering and mathematics—is awarded annually to about 300 college sophomores and juniors. The scholarship is awarded based on merit, and the actual amount given is based on financial need, up to a maximum of $7,500 per academic year. In addition, since at least 2006, about 150 exceptional applicants not awarded the Scholarship have been recognized with official Honorable Mentions.

Colleges and universities are allowed to nominate only four of their undergraduate students per year to receive the final scholarship, making it a premier award in the US conferred upon undergraduates studying the sciences.  

In awarding scholarships, the Foundation considers the field of study, career objectives, commitment, and potential for a significant professional contribution. This is judged by letters of reference, student essays, and prior research experience.  The number of scholarships per region depends on the number and qualifications of the nominees for that region. The regions are defined as each of the 50 U.S. states, the District of Columbia, Puerto Rico, and, considered as a single entity, Guam, the United States Virgin Islands, American Samoa, and the Northern Mariana Islands.

Goldwater scholars by university statistics 
The table below represents the top 20 universities based upon the number of Goldwater Scholars they have produced as of March 22, 2006.

Change in number of scholarships awarded, 2019

In 2019, the Barry Goldwater Scholarship and Excellence in Education Foundation partnered with the Department of Defense National Defense Education Programs (NDEP) to dramatically increase the number of scholarships offered from the historical average of 15-20% of nominees at the national level to over 40%. This awarded a Goldwater scholarship to all students who would have received an Honorable Mention in previous years.

Changes implemented in 2020

 Nomination materials will now be reviewed by discipline instead of state of residence.

 Four-year schools that present a transfer student as a nominee can also nominate an additional (5th) student.

 Institutions cannot reduce a student's institutionally-controlled scholarship funding after a student receives the Goldwater award.

 The foundation will no longer reduce a student’s Goldwater award if the student receives additional scholarship funding during the same year.

References

External links
 Goldwater Scholarship at ACT.org
 Goldwater Scholarship at scholarsapply.org

Awards established in 1986
Scholarships in the United States
Barry Goldwater
1986 establishments in the United States